The 1964 Cork Intermediate Hurling Championship was the 55th staging of the Cork Intermediate Hurling Championship since its establishment by the Cork County Board in 1909.

Castletownroche won the championship following a 4–11 to 3–06 defeat of Youghal in the final. This was their second championship title overall and their first title since 1922.

References

Cork Intermediate Hurling Championship
Cork Intermediate Hurling Championship